Phana is a district (amphoe) of Amnat Charoen province, northeastern Thailand.

History
The district goes back to Mueang Phana Nikhom, which was a subordinate of Mueang Ubon Ratchathani. It was converted into a district in 1914. The district office was in Ban Khulu, which is now in Trakan Phuet Phon district. On 1 December 1951 the western part of the district was split off as the minor district (king amphoe) Phana. It was upgraded to a full district on 22 July 1959. In 1993 it was one of the districts which formed the new province, Amnat Charoen.

Geography
Neighboring districts are (from the west clockwise): Lue Amnat, Mueang Amnat Charoen, and Pathum Ratchawongsa of Amnat Charoen Province; and Trakan Phuet Phon, Lao Suea Kok, and Muang Sam Sip of Ubon Ratchathani province.

Administration
The district is divided into four sub-districts (tambons), which are further subdivided into 56 villages (mubans). There are two sub-district municipalities (thesaban tambons). Phra Lao covers parts of tambon Phra Lao, and Phana covers further parts of tambon Phra Lao and parts of tambon Phana. There are a further three tambon administrative organizations (TAO).

References

External links
amphoe.com (Thai)

Phana